Betsy Sullivan (born 5 January 1956) is a Jamaican diver. She competed in the women's 3 metre springboard event at the 1972 Summer Olympics.

References

1956 births
Living people
Jamaican female divers
Olympic divers of Jamaica
Divers at the 1972 Summer Olympics
Commonwealth Games competitors for Jamaica
Divers at the 1966 British Empire and Commonwealth Games
Place of birth missing (living people)